The Swedish pétanque championships is the largest Swedish pétanque competition. It's been arranged since 1978. The first year the championships were held in Bara and had 150 competitors. In the early 2000s it had around 2500 competitors.

Cities 

The championships have been held in the following places:

References 

Sports competitions in Sweden